Webcal is a uniform resource identifier (URI) scheme for accessing iCalendar files. WebCal allows you to create and maintain an interactive events calendar or scheduling system on a Web site or app.

The webcal scheme was devised for use with the Apple iCal application and has become a common de facto standard for accessing iCalendar formatted files via WebDAV, usually using GET method. It is not an official URI scheme, such as http and ftp, as registered with IANA. , the webcal scheme has provisional status with IANA.  The Webcal protocol prefix is used to trigger an external protocol handler which is passed the URL of the .ics file rather than being passed the downloaded contents of the file, in much the same way feed is sometimes used to trigger external RSS readers. The idea is that with this protocol prefix the target file should be subscribed to rather than imported into the calendar application as would happen with a simple download.

Handlers 
Notable software packages and web applications supporting the webcal protocol include:
 Google Calendar
 Microsoft Outlook
 Mozilla Lightning

Alternative protocols
CalDAV and GroupDAV are both efforts to provide WebDAV-based access to calendar stores with finer granularity. The CalDAV Access protocol has been standardized by the IETF and published as RFC 4791. Extensions to CalDAV for automated scheduling are also standardized, as RFC 6638.

Neither of those protocols call for using DAV style URIs.  Instead, both drafts call for using the HTTP OPTIONS feature to return that the server supports calendaring extensions.

See also 
List of URI schemes

References

External links 
 : Calendar Access Protocol (CAP)
 : Internet Calendaring and Scheduling Core Object Specification (iCalendar) (replaces ) 
 Webcal description and rationale archived at the Wayback Machine.

URI schemes